The 1954 New Zealand Grand Prix was a motor race held at the Ardmore Circuit on 9 January 1954. This was the first New Zealand Grand Prix since 1950 and the second overall. This was also the first New Zealand Grand Prix to be held at the Ardmore Circuit, a venue that would be used for the Grand Prix until 1962. The Grand Prix was won by Australian Stan Jones, driving the Maybach Special in a spectacular drive over Britain's Ken Wharton and fellow Australian, Tony Gaze.

Controversy arose regarding the overall result. Horace Gould would claim to have had completed 101 laps and that he had finished first, ahead of Jones. When Gould's protest was entered and upheld by the stewards (moving Gould from fourth to second), Wharton and Gaze subsequently protested against Gould, which led to an investigation as to where Gould had actually finished. It was discovered that while Gould did indeed complete 101 laps, his finishing time for 100 laps (race distance) still left him classified as being in fourth. Gould withdrew any further complaint and the original result remained.

Classification

References

New Zealand Grand Prix
Grand Prix
January 1954 sports events in New Zealand